Benedikt Schmid (born 19 November 1990 in Waldkirchen) is a German footballer.

Schmid came through the youth ranks of TSV Waldkirchen before moving to SSV Jahn Regensburg. In 2009, he signed for 1. FC Bad Kötzting, scoring six goals in 20 appearances, but couldn't help the team from being relegated from the Bayernliga. A year later, after completing his Zivildienst, Schmid moved back to Regensburg where he made his professional debut in the 3. Liga in 2011. After four years, he left for DJK Vilzing.

References

External links 
 

1990 births
Living people
People from Freyung-Grafenau
Sportspeople from Lower Bavaria
German footballers
Association football forwards
3. Liga players
SSV Jahn Regensburg players
Footballers from Bavaria
SSV Jahn Regensburg II players